The Timucuan Ecological and Historic Preserve is a U.S. National Preserve in Jacksonville, Florida. It comprises  of wetlands, waterways, and other habitats in northeastern Duval County. Managed by the National Park Service in cooperation with the City of Jacksonville and Florida State Parks, it includes natural and historic areas such as the Fort Caroline National Memorial and the Kingsley Plantation.

The preserve was established in 1988 and expanded in 1999 by Preservation Project Jacksonville.

Background

The Fort Caroline National Memorial is located in the Timucuan Preserve, as is the Kingsley Plantation, the oldest standing plantation in the state. The Preserve is maintained through cooperation by the National Park Service, the Florida Department of Environmental Protection and the City of Jacksonville Department of Parks and Recreation. It is named for the Timucua Indians who had 35 chiefdoms throughout northern Florida and south Georgia at the time of Spanish colonization.

Archeological excavation by a University of North Florida team has revealed more information about indigenous peoples in the area.  On Black Hammock Island, they have discovered remnants of the second-oldest pottery in the United States, dating to 2500 BCE. (There have been slightly older finds in the Savannah River area.)

They also have excavated more recent artifacts contemporary with the Mocama chiefdom. In the last 25 years, these Native American people have been recognized as distinct from the Timucua, although they spoke a Timucuan dialect. Their chiefdom extended from the St. Johns River to St. Simons Island, Georgia.

Archeologists believe they have found evidence of a Spanish mission on the island as well. San Juan del Puerto, one of the oldest Spanish missions in Florida, was established here during the 16th century. Franciscan brothers were missionaries to the Timucua and Guale Indians along the coast, whose territory included the Sea Islands in Georgia and up to the Savannah River.

On June 9, 2020, the Preserve gained another 2,500 acres of marshland along the Nassau River from two private land trusts.

Trails
Several trails allow the public to explore the natural habitats protected at the preserve.

 Fort Caroline National Memorial
 Hammock Trail
 Spanish Pond
 Theodore Roosevelt Area
 Timucuan Trail
 Willie Browne Trail with bird observation platform
 Cedar Point
 Cedar Point Loop Trail
 Pinelands Trail
 Fort George Island
 Saturiwa Trail
 Big Talbot Island State Park
 Shoreline Trail

See also
 Big Talbot Island State Park
 Fort George Island Cultural State Park
 Little Talbot Island State Park
 Kingsley Plantation

References

External links

 Timucuan Ecological and Historic Preserve, National Park Service
 Timucuan Ecological and Historical Preserve: Water Resources Management Plan (November 1996, 160 pages)

Geography of Jacksonville, Florida
Parks in Jacksonville, Florida
Protected areas established in 1988
National Park Service areas in Florida
National Preserves of the United States
National Register of Historic Places in Jacksonville, Florida
Arlington, Jacksonville
Northside, Jacksonville
1988 establishments in Florida
Timucuan Ecological and Historic Preserve
Fort George Island